Fabian McCarthy is a Jamaican footballer who plays for UWI F.C. in the National Premier League. He made his debut for the Jamaica national football team in 2018.

Career

Club

International
McCarthy plays for Jamaica.

References

Jamaican footballers
UWI F.C. players
Association football midfielders
Jamaica international footballers
Sportspeople from Kingston, Jamaica
Montego Bay United F.C. players
1990 births
Living people